Prueba Villafranca de Ordizia – Clásica de Ordizia is a Spanish professional cycle road race held in Ordizia, Basque Country. The first edition was held in 1922. Since 2005, the race has been organized as a 1.1 event on the UCI Europe Tour.

Winners

External links 
 

Cycle races in the Basque Country
Recurring sporting events established in 1922
1922 establishments in Spain
UCI Europe Tour races